Albany County is the name of two jurisdictions in the United States in different states:

Albany County, New York
Albany County, Wyoming